Mpho Gift Leremi (13 October 1984 – 3 September 2007) was a South African football midfielder who last played for Mamelodi Sundowns in the Premier Soccer League, and South Africa. Leremi died in a car crash on 3 September 2007 near Johannesburg, South Africa.

Career
Leremi was an offensive midfielder who began his career with the youth club Pimville Giants in Soweto, where he was born, and discovered by Orlando Pirates in 1999 at a local soccer tournament. Upon joining the Pirates development team, Augusto Palacios, the Pirates youth director, immediately recognized the talent in the player and took him under his wing.

Leremi made his debut for Orlando Pirates in 2002–03 season of the Premier Soccer League on 10 August 2002 against Moroka Swallows, winning the league title in his debut season.

In the summer of 2007 he moved to the then Premier Soccer League champions Mamelodi Sundowns.

Death
On 3 September 2007, Leremi was returning home after a CAF Confederation Cup game in Cameroon against Astres FC when he was involved in a traffic collision in Alberton outside Johannesburg. He sustained massive injuries and ultimately died as a result of the accident.

References

1984 births
2007 deaths
Association football midfielders
Orlando Pirates F.C. players
Mamelodi Sundowns F.C. players
Road incident deaths in South Africa
South African soccer players
South Africa international soccer players
2005 CONCACAF Gold Cup players
Sportspeople from Soweto